Haylynn Cohen  (born October 9, 1980) is an American model.

Biography
Most notable for her modeling career. She was discovered while skateboarding as a Lincoln High School student. She has appeared on the cover of Vogue Paris and in the 2000 Victoria's Secret Fashion Show.  She did extensive runway and print work for many notable fashion companies between 1999 and 2001. A native of  Brooklyn, her brother is Adam Cohen of Mommyheads.

Modeling career

Advertising 

 1999 S/S Versace photographed by Steven Meisel
 1999 S/S Louis Vuitton 
 1999 S/S Victor Victoria photographed by Carter Smith
 Armani Exchange
 Burberry 
 C Ronson
 DKNY photographerd by Mikael Jannson
 Evan Picone
 Gap photographed by Steven Meisel
 Gap Holiday photographed by Peter Lindbergh
 Guy Laroche
 Hugo Boss
 J.Crew
 John Frieda
 Kenneth Cole
 Missoni
 Olay 
 Philosophy di Alberta Ferretti
 Piazza Sempione
 Realway
 Saks Fifth Avenue
 Tommy Hilfiger
 Versace

Covers 

 1999 L'Official Copyrights Editions Jalou
 1999 Vogue Paris Copyrights Condè Nast Publications
 1999 Vogue Spain 
 2000 Glamour Italy
 2001 Vogue Australia
 2002 Cosmopolitan
 D Magazine 4 times

Fashion Shows  
Ready to wear - Spring/Summer 1999 {Chloe}

Ready to wear - Autumn/Winter 1999 {Burberry}

Ready to wear - Spring/Summer 2000 {Alberta Ferretti, Alessandro Dell'Acqua, Anna Molinari, Antonio Berardi, Blumarine, Bottega Veneta, Byblos, Callaghan, Calvin Klein, Cerruti, Chanel, Christian Dior, Christian Lacroix, Costume National, Cynthia Rowley, DKNY, Emanuel Ungaro, Herve Leger, Jill Stuart, Koji Tatsuno, Les Copains, Loewe, Marc Jacobs, Mila Schon, Narciso Rodriguez, Nicole Farhi, Nicole Miller, Nina Ricci, Paco Rabanne, Ralph Lauren, Rebecca Danenberg, Sportmax, TSE, Ter et Bantine, Trussardi, Versace, Versus, Victor Alfaro, Victor Victoria, Vivienne Tam, YSL Rive Gauche}

Ready to wear - Autumn/Winter 2000 {AA Milano, Anteprima, Betsey Johnson, Blumarine, Cerruti, Chaiken, Chanel, Christian Dior, Christina Perrin, Costume National, Emanuel Ungaro, Exté, Fendi, Jill Stuart, Joop, Junko Shimada, Koji Tatsuno, Loewe, Marc Jacobs, Mark Eisen, Mila Schon, Narciso Rodriguez, Nina Ricci, Ralph Lauren, Rebecca Danenberg, Rifat Ozbek, Sportmax, TSE, Tuleh, Versace, Versus, Vivienne Tam}

Ready to wear - Spring/Summer 2001 {AA Milano, Alessandro Dell'Acqua, Andrew Gn, Anna Molinari, Bill Blass, Blumarine, Calvin Klein, Chanel, Christian Lacroix, Etro, Genny, John Richmond, Junko Shimada, Koji Tatsuno, Lizzy Disney, Loewe, Marcel Marongiu, Mila Schon, Rebecca Taylor, Sally Penn, Sportmax, TSE, Ter et Bantine, Trussardi, Versace, Versus}

Ready to wear - Autumn/Winter 2001 {Alberto Biani, Blumarine, Chaiken, Christian Lacroix, Daryl K, Isabel Marant, Marcel Marongiu, Mila Schon, Sportmax, Trussardi}

Victoria's Secret {2000}

Personal life 
In 2002, she opened a nightclub named Joey's on Avenue B in Manhattan's East Village, with her boyfriend, Joe Gossett.  The business was financed by Oliver Stone and Stephen Dorff.  The couple broke up in 2004. She is known for her Jewish heritage.
Cohen is married to American geneticist Andrew Conrad. Together they have 2 children.

Cohen has purchased and sold property in Manhattan, NY in the Soho neighborhood.

Notes

External links
See Haylynn Cohen at: Fashion Model Directory, supermodels.nl

Female models from New York (state)
Living people
People from Brooklyn
1980 births
Models from New York City
Abraham Lincoln High School (Brooklyn) alumni
21st-century American women